Alfredo Rocca (born 5 May 1908, date of death unknown) was an Argentine freestyle swimmer. He competed in two events at the 1932 Summer Olympics.

References

External links
 

1908 births
Year of death missing
Argentine male freestyle swimmers
Olympic swimmers of Argentina
Swimmers at the 1932 Summer Olympics
Swimmers from Buenos Aires
20th-century Argentine people